Misogyny in ice hockey refers to the discourses, actions, and ideologies which are currently present in ice hockey, environments which contribute to the discrimination against women in the sport as well as their absence from it. This phenomenon includes issues related to sexism and male chauvinism. The subject has been extensively discussed in both media and academia, with many women in the sport increasingly speaking out about the extent of misogyny in hockey and its negative impact on the sport.

History

Late 1800s to middle 1900s 
Women have participated in organized ice hockey and other sports from the late nineteenth century onwards. Modern organized sports did not exist until after the industrial age.

Historically, organized women's ice hockey has only developed relatively recently as an enduring phenomenon. From the late 1800s, when the sport first began to organize formally, and throughout most of the 1900s, national ice hockey associations found little evidence of existing interest among the female population in regards to participation in ice hockey while substantial interest existed for participation in other winter sports such as figure skating and broomball. In Canada, participation among girls and women in ice hockey by the 1980s registered less than six thousand players nationwide.

In the beginning, ice hockey was only played by either sex in the areas of North America which had the right climate that would make a winter season possible, restricting the sports growth. Until indoor ice rinks became more widespread, all players, male or female, had to play outdoors where ice was available and could be found. Since registrations were low prior to the mid-1980s, female players had few options when it came to finding other girls to play with and against and felt intimidated by the fact that they had to compete against boys and men. The fact that males in comparison to females have a biological advantage which impacts athletic performance including factors such as physical size, mass, weight, and power, all served as a major deterrent for potential female participants. In addition, body checking was still a part of the female category of the sport, causing further discouragement, until it began to be removed in the mid-1980s in Canada after which registrations increased. A combination of factors crippled the growth of the female game by creating restrictions, namely those related to climate, a lack of interest among the female population, body checking, and a lack of girls and women to participate with. Misogyny in ice hockey however became more evident in the late part of the 1900s and remains a complex subject.

Formal organization

The first record of an organized women's team reports one formed at Queen's University in Kingston, Ontario. The group dubbed themselves the Love-Me-Littles after being shunned by the community, the school's archbishop declaring that young women should not be playing hockey.

As World War I hit in the 1910s, women's hockey began a marked period of growth, with tournaments at the Jubilee Arena routinely selling out while the men were off at war. One of the game's star players, Albertine Lapensée, was routinely accused of being a man. Lapensée left the sport after asking for a share of the profits her team was generating. When American investors attempted to organise an All-Star Team to tour the United States, they were forced to drop their bid after the Montreal Star newspaper ran a campaign against it, declaring that any woman who participated in the tour would lose their virtue.

After the war ended, investment and media coverage disappeared. In 1923, the Canadian Amateur Hockey Association voted not to give women official recognition as hockey players. During the Great Depression in Canada, the Ladies Ontario Hockey Association experienced a heavy decline for various reasons, including increasing competition for ice time. Its most successful team, the Preston Rivulettes, which still drew substantial audiences, were forced to fold as Second World War hit. The military pressured the facilities and the league failed to receive the same support as the men's leagues. The men's leagues were deemed to be morale boosters.

Abby Hoffman, born in 1947, became an all-star defender in an Ontario boys' league in Canada in the 1950s. Her parents concealed her sex and placed her on a boys team due to the fact that there weren't any local girls hockey teams. One report stated that when her sex was discovered, "people were incredulous. They couldn’t believe it. Most people assumed that no girl would want to play." However, Abby was only nine years old at the time and had not yet entered puberty.

Middle to late 1900s

Competition from ringette
In Canada, the new ice skating team sport of ringette was created in 1963.
At that time, only bandy and ice hockey existed as options for playing an ice skating team sport anywhere in the world regardless of the sex of the players involved. Bandy required the use of a bandy field while ice hockey made use of the smaller ice rink.

The sport of ringette was made specifically for girls and excluded boys and also excluded body contact and body checking as a consequence of ringette's origin, having initially been inspired by a variant of floor hockey created during the Great Depression in Canada and including concepts borrowed from basketball. While ringette was first intended to be an indoor court sport for girls, it was soon decided to make it an ice skating team game for them instead. In the beginning, ringette used both figure skates and ice hockey skates. By the early 1980s, roughly 20 years after its creation, ringette had experienced substantial growth in Canada, with ringette players now using ice hockey skates almost exclusively and the sport outpacing registrations observed in Canadian female ice hockey with female hockey registering only 40% of ringette's numbers. Ringette by comparison had over 14,000 registrations nationally while female ice hockey only broke 5,000. Ringette had also successfully developed an international following, developing a particularly strong hold in Finland and had also been introduced to a variety of other countries including the United States. In 1986, body checking was officially removed from female ice hockey by its organizers in Canada and began to see a rapid increase in registrations, with the controversial decision for the removal of body checking proving a success. Fierce competition for on ice female talent ensued between the two team sports of ice hockey and ringette, particularly in Canada, but was also witnessed in parts of the USA where the sport had failed to take a strong hold unlike in Finland. In Canada, a short decline in ringette registrations occurred after 1998, but within a decade began to see an increase in registrations once again reaching its peak registration level nationally during the 2018–2019 season.

Formal organization

Women's hockey began to take on more formal structures in the second half of the 20th century, with the first women's ice hockey program in the United States established at Brown University in 1965 and with Modo AIK facing off against Timrå IK in the first organized women's hockey match in Sweden in 1969. 
National associations continued to ignore the need to develop the women's game model due to a lack of interest among the female population compared to the male side and as a consequence often imposed a wide variety of differing local rules, making international competition difficult to organize. Canada's Fran Rider, who was one of the founders of the Ontario Women's Hockey Association observed: "It is important to understand that support from the minor hockey community did not exist for females, so any progress was in spite of discouragement by male hockey. We had to deal with problems like bad ice, few leagues and no support systems."

By the mid-1980s, the International Ice Hockey Federation (IIHF) was coming under substantial pressure to formally codify a consistent set of rules and structures for the women's game but failed to do so, leading to calls for the formation of a separate women's international ice hockey federation. However, International Olympic Committee president Juan Antonio Samaranch informed the IIHF that the IOC would not communicate with separate federations. Within a decade, the 1990 IIHF Women's World Championship was organized and hosted in Ottawa, Canada, and became the first IIHF-sanctioned international tournament in women's ice hockey, 70 years after the first men's World Championship was held. The tournament suffered a number of issues, including Fran Rider organizing the tournament without financial support from the Canadian Amateur Hockey Association and Team Canada wearing infamous pink jerseys as a marketing decision. The location of the tournament was chosen five months before it started, and priority for ice-time was given to the junior men's Ottawa 67s team, meaning that sale of tickets only began a few weeks before the start of the championship.

In 1998, women's ice hockey was added to the Winter Olympics. In 2001, women's hockey became an NCAA-sanctioned sport for the first time, with the launch of the NCAA Women's Ice Hockey Tournament.

21st century

United States

In March 2017, the players of the United States women's national ice hockey team announced their intention to strike ahead of the 2017 IIHF Women's World Championship, after over a year of failed negotiations with USA Hockey concerning wages and playing conditions. At the time, USA Hockey was spending an estimated 3.5 million dollars a year on youth development programs for boys, but was not making any expenditures which would help development programs for girls.

Sweden

In May 2017, IF Sundsvall Hockey cut its women's team, who were playing in the top-level of Swedish women's hockey, citing a need to save money for its third-tier men's side. The club was criticized for the decision, with forward Mathilda Gustafsson stating:

In August 2019, the players of the Sweden women's national ice hockey team went on strike over the lack of financial support and poor conditions they faced from the Swedish Ice Hockey Association.

Canada

After the collapse of the Canadian Women's Hockey League in May 2019, over 200 players announced their intentions to sit out from any professional leagues in the hopes of securing greater investment and media coverage of the sport. The #ForTheGame movement soon became more formally organised in the form of the Professional Women's Hockey Players Association.

In February 2019, the University of British Columbia changed its policy of giving its men's hockey team preference in scheduling matches after complaints from players on the women's team, who had a better record than the men's team at the time.

In March 2019, a girls peewee team in Mauricie, in Québec, made it to the finals of the boys' regional finals before being kicked out of the tournament and being forced to cede their place in the finals to the boys' team they had defeated in the semi-finals.

In 2019 Hockey Canada instituted a new bylaw requiring its five-member board of directors to have at least two men and two women in order to improve representation on the board.

Sex crimes and sexual harassment

1990s 
In 1994, ECHL player Billy Tibbetts plead guilty to statutory rape. In 1995, while on probation for the statutory rape case, Tibbetts was convicted of assault and battery with a dangerous weapon (a BB gun), disorderly conduct and witness intimidation, and served 39 months in prison. In 2000, he signed an NHL contract with the Pittsburgh Penguins.

2010s 
In March 2014, the University of Ottawa suspended its men's hockey programme after multiple players were accused of sexual assault. In November 2014, the OHL suspended two players for 15 games after the players had made a number of misogynistic comments on social media.

In March 2015, Ohio State University forced women's hockey head coach Nate Handrahan to resign after being investigated for sexual harassing players.

In June 2018, eight members of the 2017-2018 Canada men's national junior ice hockey team allegedly assaulted a woman at a Hockey Canada event in London, Ontario. Hockey Canada paid $3.55 million CAD to the woman in May 2022 but the matter reopened in July 2022.

2020s  
In March 2020, Alyssa Wruble, while playing on the Northampton Area High School hockey team, was bullied over being the only girl on the team, with numerous fans holding up signs and chanting for her to reveal her gender and saying that she had a penis. The Parkland Ice Hockey president Mike Byelick stepped down from his position due to the incident.

Amid the COVID-19 pandemic, the IIHF cancelled the 2021 IIHF World Women's U18 Championship, but intends to proceed with the boys' 2021 World Junior Ice Hockey Championships. The IIHF was criticised by several for the decision, with U18 Team Canada player Jade Maisonneuve stating that "COVID doesn't exactly discriminate... I understand why the women's tournament was cancelled, but why both weren't is a little questionable."

In 2022 it was revealed that Hockey Canada, which handles multiple sexual assault allegations per year, diverts a portion of player registration fees to a special fund worth approximately $15 million to "pay out settlements in cases of alleged sexual assault without its insurance company, and with minimal outside scrutiny". In federal hearings in July, Hockey Canada explained that from 1989 to 2022 it helped settle 21 cases, paying nearly $9 million CAD. Amid "growing calls for a leadership overhaul to address the troubling culture" in hockey, the organization's CEO said he had no plans to resign.

Hockey Hall of Fame  
In 2010, Cammi Granato and Angela James became the first two women to be inducted into the Hockey Hall of Fame as players. The Hall of Fame, however, introduced a rule at the same time limiting the number of women who could be inducted each year to two, and as of 2020 has only inducted six other women (and 36 men) leading to accusations of sexism, male chauvinism, and misogyny.

After scoring the Clarkson Cup-winning goal in 2015, Boston Blades forward Janine Weber was asked by the Hall to donate the stick she had scored with, however it was one of only two sticks she had. She was forced to reach out via Twitter to organise a sponsorship for herself to replace the stick she had donated.

In January 2019, the Hall of Fame was criticised for the disparity between the baby clothes in their gift shop, with the boys' clothes proclaiming "Future hockey legend" and the girls' clothes proclaiming "Cutie".

Discrimination lawsuits

Canada 
In 1981, Justine Blainey-Broker, born in 1973, won a roster position on a boys' team in the Metro Toronto Hockey League, was barred from playing by the league when she was 13 years of age because of her sex since ice hockey was now divided by male and female categories of the sport. Her discrimination complaint against the team was ultimately successful when it reached the Ontario Court of Appeal in 1986.

In the year 2000, a group of women filed a complaint against the University of Saskatchewan under the Saskatchewan Human Rights Code for giving the university's men's hockey team preferential treatment. The university lost the case.

After the University of New Brunswick downgraded the status of their varsity women's hockey programme in 2008 and stripped it of its funding, players on the team filed a discrimination complaint with the province's Labour and Employment Board. After the board ruled in the players' favour, the university reinstated the programme in 2017.

United States of America 

In 2015, former Olympian Shannon Miller sued the University of Minnesota for discrimination after she was fired. The university had cited the need to cut costs behind the decision to fire her, yet did not fire the men's hockey program head coach, despite him having a higher salary and a substantially less successful record. In 2018, she won the case and was awarded 3,7 million $ in damages.

In June 2018, 11 former University of North Dakota women's players sued the university over the decision to axe the women's hockey programme in 2017, alleging that the university failed to meet its Title XI requirements to effectively accommodate student interests and abilities.

Misogyny in the National Hockey League (NHL) 
In August 2014, the Chicago Blackhawks announced that they stop playing "The Stripper" in between periods entertainment following a fan petition. Early that year, the team had been criticised for displays of sexism at the Blackhawks Convention, with the moderator, Mark Giangreco, focusing on the attractiveness of captain Jonathan Toews's partner instead of his trophy awards.

In April 2015, NHL commissioner Gary Bettman defended the use of chants by spectators comparing Anaheim Ducks forward Corey Perry to Katy Perry. The chants had been criticised as being sexist for attempting to degrade Perry by calling him a woman, especially since there had been previous similar incidents, such as calling Sidney Crosby “Princess Crosby”. EA Sports' NHL 15 video game was criticised sexist portrayals of women hockey fans in its marketing for the game.

As of October 2018, the NHL was the only one of the so-called big four men's professional sports leagues in North America not to have a policy on domestic abuse.

By mid-2019, less than 5% of hockey operations jobs in the NHL were held by women. In March 2019, the NHL and the NHLPA established a Female Hockey Advisory Committee to try and increased opportunities for women in the sport.

In April 2020, a former Tampa Bay Lightning youth hockey coach sued the team, alleging that she was fired after filing a complaint over being sexually assaulted by a team executive. Later that year, the Los Angeles Kings suspended their senior manager of game presentation and events after he was sued by a former Kings employee for sexual harassment. In November 2020, Jarrod Skalde sued the Pittsburgh Penguins, accusing the team of covering up sexual assaults committed by Clark Donatelli, the head coach of the team's AHL affiliate.

Incidents involving NHL players 
In 1983, the ex-wife of New York Islanders captain Denis Potvin accused him of domestic violence. In 1988, Doug Gilmour was accused of seducing a 13-year-old girl who was working as a babysitter for him, although a jury chose not to indict him.

In 1998, retired NHLer Steve Durbano was arrested and found guilty of running a prostitution ring.

Los Angeles Kings defender Joe Corvo was arrested in November 2002 after assaulting a woman in a restaurant in Boston, eventually being given a three-year suspended sentence and suspended for three NHL games by his team. In 2005, Kristian Huselius, Henrik Tallinder, and Andreas Lilja were suspended from the Swedish national team after accusations of rape.

In 2011, Toronto Maple Leafs defender Mike Komisarek was accused of assaulting a woman at a nightclub.

In July 2012, New Jersey Devils defender Cam Janssen apologized after making a string of homophobic and sexist comments in a podcast.

In May 2014, former Winnipeg Jets star Thomas Steen was charged with domestic violence.

In October 2014, Los Angeles Kings defender Slava Voynov was arrested on charges of domestic abuse. His contract was terminated by the club and he was suspended indefinitely. He has since played multiple seasons in the KHL and played in the 2018 Winter Olympics, and his suspension was reduced after an appeal by the NHLPA.

In February 2015, Toronto Maple Leafs defender Morgan Rielly was widely criticized for saying that he wasn't "here to be a girl about it" after a loss. He later apologised for the comment.

In March 2015, Nashville Predators forward Mike Ribeiro was sued by a former nanny employed by him and his wife over allegations of him sexually assaulting her. The case was settled out of court.

In July 2016, the Winnipeg Jets announced they would be inducting former player Bobby Hull into the team's hall of fame despite long-standing allegations of him perpetuating domestic violence.

In 2016, Toronto Maple Leafs goaltender Garret Sparks was suspended indefinitely for violating team policy after directing violent and sexist language toward a user in an online hockey related Facebook group of which he was the administrator.

In December 2016, Edmonton Oilers forward Pat Maroon was criticized for stating "This is a man's game" after team captain Connor McDavid was removed from the ice due to NHL concussion protocol.

In May 2019, Toronto Maple Leafs forward Auston Matthews was charged with disorderly conduct after an incident where he exposed himself to a female security guard. He was named an assistant captain for the team ahead of the 2019–20 season and was nominated for the 2020 Lady Byng Award for sportsmanlike conduct.

In May 2020, Washington Capitals forward Brendan Leipsic was waived after leaked social messages showed him making a number of derogatory comments towards women. Former player and LGBT+ advocate Brock McGillis stated in response to the scandal that "Every player I’ve been around has used this type of language: racist, sexist or homophobic language." In November 2020, Sharks forward and Hockey Diversity Alliance co-head Evander Kane apologised after having tweeted using sexist language.

Incidents involving NHL commentators 
In May 2011, former NHL player and ESPN commentator Matthew Barnaby was arrested on charges of domestic violence.

In April 2013, Hockey Night in Canada personality Don Cherry made widely criticized comments stating that women didn't belong in hockey locker-rooms. Some circles within the gender feminist sports community claimed this was evidence of misogyny. The comments came after Chicago Blackhawks defender Duncan Keith had been criticized for telling a female reporter: "The first female referee. You can't play probably either, right? But you're thinking the game like you know it?"

In August 2014, Yahoo commentator Harrison Mooney was fired from his role at the NHL Puck Daddy blog over claims of sexual harassment.

In 2014, journalist Adrian Dater, who had covered the Colorado Avalanche for the Denver Post since the mid-90s, was fired after a series of incidents of social media abuse, including sending inappropriate messages to a female NHL fan.

In March 2015, NHL free agent Dustin Penner was fired from a position as an analyst in TSN's trade deadline coverage after making rape jokes on Twitter.

In January 2019, NBC commentator Pierre McGuire was criticized for making condescending comments towards US Olympian Kendall Coyne Schofield, who was serving as an analyst during a NHL game.

In 2019, former NHL player and NBC analyst Jeremy Roenick was suspended for making a number of inappropriate comments about his co-workers, including sexual comments about Kathryn Tappen. After his suspension ended, he was fired by the network.

In August 2020, NBC commentator Mike Milbury was criticized after comparing the lack of fans at the Stanley Cup playoffs due to the COVID-19 pandemic to the supporters of women's hockey teams. A few days later, Milbury apologised and announced that he was stepping back from NBC coverage of the playoffs.

Multiple NHL teams and players have been criticized for collaborating with Barstool Sports, despite Barstool facing a long list of allegations of harassment, cyberbullying, and misogyny.

Ice Girls 
Several NHL teams have come under criticism for the use of cheerleading teams known as Ice Girls, consisting of young women wearing revealing uniforms. The practice has been criticised as objectifying and for poor working conditions faced by the women.

The first Ice Girls squad had been introduced by the New York Islanders in the 2001–02 season. In 2007, the New York Rangers stopped using Ice Girls after a lawsuit by a former Ice Girl accusing team officials of sexual harassment. In 2014, the Philadelphia Flyers temporarily stopped the practice after complaints of poor working conditions, including having to work outdoors in sub-zero temperature in shorts and being forced to spend hundreds of dollars a month out of their own pocket on cosmetics. The Flyers re-introduced the squads after the replacement ice-cleaning workers were booed by fans. Later in 2014, the San José Sharks introduced Ice Girl squads, despite a fan petition gathering hundreds of signatures. In 2015, the Islanders stopped the practice after changing arenas.

Multiple NHL teams have defended the practice, with the Colorado Avalanche stating in 2014 that "It's what every college in the country does. It's what every NBA team in the country does. It's what every lacrosse team in the country does."

NHL relations with women's hockey  
The league has received criticism for exhibiting a lack of initiative to support professional women's hockey on a more than superficial level. In 2019, the league donated only $100, 000 to the NWHL, despite the average NHL team making a $25 million profit that year, and has owned a trademark for the name "Women's National Hockey League (WNHL)" since at least 2012 without making any moves to create such a league. After the collapse of the Canadian Women's Hockey League (CWHL), both the Buffalo Sabres and New Jersey Devils severed their affiliations with the local National Women's Hockey League (NWHL) teams. The league did, however, contribute some money to helping the CWHL pay off its debts.

A couple of weeks before the 2015 NHL Winter Classic, the NHL announced that a showcase game between the Canadian Women's Hockey League's Candiennes de Montréal, and the National Women's Hockey League's, the Boston Pride, would be held before the event. The game was marked by several controversies, including potentially sub-standard ice as the game was held directly after the NHL's teams' practice, a lack of publicity, and no broadcasting or streaming options available for fans to watch the games.

In 2019, the NHL was criticized after it emerged that the league would not be paying Brianna Decker for her demonstration of the passing accuracy skills competition, despite fans unofficially clocking her time as three seconds faster than the competition's winner Leon Draisaitl. After company CCM Hockey pledged to pay her an equal amount to what Draisaitl won, the NHL announced that it had clocked her time as six seconds longer than his and would be donating $25 000  to a charity of Decker's choice.

The league expanded women's participation in the 2020 All-Star game, and announced it would be paying the players an appearance fee and making a donation towards girls' hockey, but would not be offering prize money.

Goaltenders

Manon Rhéaume
In 1992, Manon Rhéaume became the first woman to attend an NHL training camp and suited up for the Tampa Bay Lightning in a pre-season game. Despite asking to be treated the same as the men's players, she was forced to use a separate dressing room. Then Lightning president and general manager, Phil Esposito, stated:

Some circles within the gender feminist sports community claimed her situation was evidence of misogyny. To date, no other female hockey player has attended an NHL training camp.

Shannon Szabados

In 2014, supporters campaigned for Shannon Szabados to be named as the emergency backup goaltender for the Edmonton Oilers, but the Oilers declined the move. Some circles within the feminist sports community claimed it was due to misogyny.

Issues  
Women who are hockey fans often face harassment targeted at their sex and/or gender appearance both at sporting events and online.⁣

In 2017, HockeySverige performed a series of interviews on sexism in the sport with top players in Sweden, including several players speaking anonymously about being sexually harassed by men in the sport. Swedish national team defender Johanna Fällman stated that "It feels like hockey is several steps behind the rest of society in Sweden." A 2018 investigation by SVT Sport found that 9 out 10 girls youth players in the Västergötland region experience degrading and sexist comments.

The barriers facing women in ice hockey can also vary from region to region, with women in more conservative regions often higher barriers to participation. Women of colour often face increased discrimination and barriers in the sport, with feminism in ice hockey having faced criticism for its lack of intersectionality.

Hockey has been widely accused of a culture of conformity, presenting an additional barrier to attempts to speak out about and change issues in the sport. It has also been suggested that the important of the sport within Canadian culture has hindered scrutiny of the sport's issues.

Rape culture  
There has been extensive discussion surrounding the widespread presence of rape culture in hockey as an issue affecting both sexes and different genders, especially in boys' junior hockey. A number of major incidents can be found on record involving players who have bern charged for sexual assault during the 2000 era with testimonies from multiple former players discussing locker-room cultures that degrade players and promote the objectification of women. There have also been multiple junior boys teams involved in serious hazing incidents.

A 2012 report by a Boston University taskforce following two incidents of players being charged with sexual assault found that a culture of "sexual entitlement" and alcohol abuse existed in the men's hockey programme. In 2014, a series of email chains between junior players starting from the early 2000s detailing their experiences was compiled into a publication released online under the title of The Junior Hockey Bible. The publication contained a large number of degrading slang terms for women commonly used by players.

A 2014 study from Lakehead University found that social problems in hockey "include, but are not limited to: extreme violence resulting in injuries and death, hazing rituals, multiple types of sexual violence, drug abuse, financial corruption, as well as various forms of prejudice and discrimination." A 2020 study from Sweden found that "Identified as components of the ice hockey culture and ‘natural’ parts of the game and community, rules that trigger fights, harsh and careless playing styles, a normalising of sexist and derogatory attitudes/language and an exaggerated alcohol consumption."

In November 2018, former NHLer Daniel Carcillo indicated that as a rookie of the 2002-03 Sarnia Sting, he and other rookies were subjected to several forms of severe hazing, which crossed over into physical and sexual assault. The accusations were corroborated by several other former Sting teammates, and a class-action lawsuit was launched. In December 2020, a large number of testimonies by former OHL players were filed to the Ontario Superior Court, detailing accounts of physical, psychological, and sexual abuse.

Lack of female coaching staff  
The large majority of coaches in ice hockey remain men, even in the women's and girls' games, leading some within the gender feminist circles in sport to conclude misogyny is what is mostly at play.

Professional
While many women have played professional women's ice hockey, it is a variant of the larger men's game creating barriers to success in the men's game.

In 2016, Dawn Braid became the first woman to hold a full-time NHL coaching position, being named a skating coach for the Arizona Coyotes. In April 2020, former Swiss Olympian Florence Schelling became the first woman to be named general manager of a top-flight professional men's team when she named as SC Bern GM.

Amateur
A 2016 study of Albertan girls' hockey found that it was commonly assumed that fathers would volunteer for coaching roles and that teams rarely attempted to communicate with or retain women as coaches.

Ahead of the 2012-13 NCAA women's Division I season, only 8 out of the 36 teams had women as head coaches. A 2015 analysis of Minnesota girls' hockey found that only 21% of teams were led by a female head coach, up from none in 2008. Ahead of the 2020–21, only two of the six NWHL head coaches are women.

Women's ice hockey

Former Russian Olympian Alexandra Kapustina has stated that: Unfortunately, in Russia sexism infects every part of life. When I finished my playing career and wanted to be a coach, I ran into it immediately. A man with no hockey experience at all stood more chance of getting a coaching role than I did, despite my vast background in women’s hockey and my coaching certificates. All those efforts crashed into a barrier of sexism. All the coaches loved to say: “Girls, the future is yours! You will be great coaches. You will lead women’s hockey into the future.” But under their breath, they muttered: “But later. When we’re gone. While we’re here, we’ll be in charge and we don’t need you near us.”

Lack of female officials  
As of 2019, there were only 2000 women among the 31 000 hockey officials registered in Canada and only 1500 among the 25 000 registed in the United States. 2019 would mark the first year that a woman would officiate at the NHL pre-training camp prospects tournament level.

During the 2018–19 season, Cassandra Gregory was due to be the first female official in the Alberta Junior Hockey League after being recommended by the regional refeering committee, however the league did not assign her to any games. Under the Hockey Canada referee qualifications system, women cannot reach Level 6, while men can. In 2019, Charlotte Girard, who had served as an official at the Olympic level and in the Ligue Magnus, the top tier of French men's hockey, spoke out about the abuse she had faced in the sport, including being physically attacked in pre-match warmups and being left out of communications between other officials.

A 2019 thesis from a graduate student at the University of Toronto found that "women officials across Canada experience abusive behaviour, and believe that discrimination prevents them from advancing to higher levels of officiating."

Exclusion from junior hockey  
A regularly cited barrier women face in hockey is the lack of youth teams and development resources. Cases exist where girls have tried to join high-performance boys' teams only to find themselves being cut, a decision they believed to be made due to their sex.

Stereotypes 
There are a number of persistent stereotypes surrounding women in hockey, such as players being perceived as too masculine, with players facing pressure to take on a more feminine appearance. Ed Snider Youth Hockey Foundation coach Nora Cothren has also stated that "the presence of homophobia in women's sports is different than that in men's sports. There is a fear among female athletes that if they speak up about gay issues, they will be automatically lumped into the stereotype of gay female athlete."

Women are also frequently stereotyped as being inherently less physically capable of high-level athletic performance. However, Umeå University professor Kajsa Gilenstam found in her doctoral thesis that the poor quality of equipment female hockey players had to use significantly impact performance: "nine out of ten female players increased puck velocity when a more flexible stick and a lighter puck were used." Further research by Gilenstam has suggested "a similar capacity of producing strength and aerobic power in female and male hockey players."

Professional hockey leagues have been criticised for reducing women to stereotypes in marketing and merchandise, such as the overuse of the colour pink in creating merchandise for women.

Puck bunnies 

A "puck bunny" is defined as a female ice hockey fan whose interest in the sport is primarily motivated by sexual attraction to the players rather than enjoyment of the game itself. The stereotype is often criticised as being derogatory towards female fans, both by objectifying them and branding them as inauthentic.

The stereotype runs into and overlaps with the prevailing idea that the majority of female fans at games are less knowledgeable about the game than male fans. However the idea has not been backed up by evidence.

Lack of investment  
Another regularly cited barrier is the lack of investment into professional's women's leagues. Even in European leagues such as the Swedish Women's Hockey League
(SDHL), where women's teams are part of the same organization as the men's teams, concerns about access to resources are widespread. Calls to invest in women's leagues are often dismissed as charity or as leagues not being able to prove themselves, despite the fact that men's leagues have often received large public subsidies to stay afloat. Some studies have found that women's sports receive less than 5% of all commercial investment in sports, despite having significant and significantly growing reach.

Pay gap  
Player salaries in professional women's hockey leagues are often extremely low even in the most elite leagues and have mostly been a recent development in the sport. The National Women's Hockey League (now renamed the Premier Hockey Federation) became the first league to offer a salary to all its players when it formed in 2015, but cut those salaries in half after only a year. In both the former NWHL and the now-defunct Canadian Women's Hockey League (CWHL), the highest paid players received around $10,000 per year.

A Unionen report released in January 2020 found that the average top-flight men's hockey player in Sweden earns more than the combined salaries for an entire top-flight women's team, with the average Swedish Hockey League (SHL) player earning 121 000 kr a month and the average Swedish Women's Hockey League (SDHL) player earning less than 5500kr a month. The report further found that 99% of the SHL players felt they were able to earn a living playing hockey, while only 7% of the SDHL players felt the same. The report also examined the resources available to players, finding that 91% of men's players had access to team doctors compared to 29% of women, and that 83% of the men were satisfied with the conditions they faced in hockey, while only 27% of the women were.

The low salaries force players to hold second full-time jobs, contributing to high levels of stress and burnout. A 2019 Hockey Sverige analysis found that of all 180 Swedish players playing in the SDHL in the 2014–15 season, over 100 had retired by 2019. In July 2020 Swedish national team player Fanny Rask announced her retirement from hockey via an Instagram post in which she voiced her frustration with the pace of professionalization in women's hockey and her exhaustion with the financial insecurity of being an SDHL player.What I dreamed of in my youth was to become a professional [ice hockey player]. That the [women's] league would grow to such an extent that we could live on hockey. (No, not millions, everyone knows it is unreasonable still.)  But I have always thought that I would be able to join-in when we become professionals. But it has not happened and I feel that we are at a standstill...  And I don't see that there will be any change. Of course, I know that things are happening but for me it is going too slowly and I am incredibly uncertain that it will ever happen... So maybe I chose the wrong path, had the wrong dream and too high of demands. I hope there are some people who still have the strength to carry on and who work for a future for women's hockey. My energy has run out, I'm empty and I'm sorry.

The lack of opportunities to make a living while playing the game also has the effect of driving young girls out of the sport, as they will not see any future in the sport.

Media coverage  
The lack of media coverage professional women's leagues is regularly cited as a major in the absence of women in hockey and as a major obstacle to the growth of professional women's hockey. Academic research has indicated that women's sports receives less than 4% of all sports media coverage, despite the fact that over 30% of all athletes are women. Media coverage of women's hockey events has also tended to be of poor quality, with low definition streams from hard-to-watch angles, as well as there being a lack of full-time journalists dedicated to covering women's hockey.

Media coverage of women's hockey has also been criticized for focusing too much on players' relatives and their personal lives and not enough on their playing performances. Coverage has also tended to comment disproportionately on players' physical appearances. A 2016 study on sports coverage from Cambridge University stated that "language around women in sport focuses disproportionately on the appearance, clothes and personal lives of women, highlighting a greater emphasis on aesthetics over athletics."

A doctoral thesis by Ryerson University professor Donna Gall found that most potential viewers of women's hockey didn't know where to access coverage of games. Gall's conclusion was that this was caused by media coverage which tended to focus on the issues facing women's hockey rather than the actual ongoing competitions, making it hard for potential viewers to follow games. A study of NBC's play-by-play commentary during the women's tournament at the 2010 Winter Olympics found that the women's players were more often compared to men's players than to other women, and that the male commentators were far more likely to hold male players up as role models for women's players.

Attempts to promote the growth of women's hockey media coverage have often been met with resistance. One often-presented argument is that women's hockey does not deserve media coverage because nobody would watch it if it did get coverage. Canadian professor Courtney Szto has spoken out against that argument by noting that a number of sporting events only significantly after they received widespread coverage, including the IIHF World Juniors. She has also pointed out that the 2019 Clarkson Cup finals, one of three CWHL games broadcast on TSN in the 2019–20 season, received ratings comparable to other sports broadcasts on the network such as Premier League games. The NWHL became the first North American professional women's hockey league to sign a broadcasting deal with a rights fee when they signed a three-year deal with Twitch in 2019. In 2018, C More had signed a deal with the SDHL to broadcast 12 games during the 2018–19 season.

Women also face higher barriers to entering the sport as journalists, often facing discrimination. Andi Petrillo, who became the first female reporter to travel on the Toronto Maple Leafs' team charter in 2006, stated that: Some people didn't care but some made my life hell because of my gender. If I was seen talking to a player, some reporters felt I was flirting. I was trying to get a story to tell; after all, I am a reporter! But because of my gender, I was flirting. I also learned there was a bet going on to see if I would get caught with a player before the NHL All-Star weekend and get fired.

Lack of record-keeping  
Women's competitions also faces barriers to accessing statistics, which can affect coverage of the game, access to information on the sport for fans, and efforts by players and coaches to improve performance. It took until July 2015 for online hockey statistics website, Elite Prospects, to begin adding female players to their database for the first time. Sports data analyst Meghan Chayka has stated that "unless you show up on a box score in women’s hockey, traditionally it’s lost. Even a lot of the game tape is hard to find."

Historical record

After the Canadian Women's Hockey League (CWHL) put all its archived artifacts and its trophies up for auction as part of the liquidation process of its collapse, several members of the women's hockey community raised concerns about the possibility that it could lead to a significant erasure of the game's history. The CWHL put all 9 of the league's trophies on the auction block, including the Angela James Bowl which was awarded to the leading point scorer each season, and the Jayna Hefford Trophy which was awarded to the league's Most Valuable Player (MVP). Trophies for the Coach of the Year, Goaltender of the Year, and Rookie of the Year were also auctioned off.

The Clarkson Cup, named after former Canadian Governor General, Adrian Clarkson, was designed by Inuit artists and depicted the sea goddess, Sedna.

See also  
 Misogyny in sports
 2019 Sweden women's national ice hockey team strike  
 U.S. women's national soccer team pay discrimination claim
 Gender pay gap in sports
 Race and ethnicity in the NHL
 Transgender people in ice hockey

References

Gender pay gap
sports
Sports culture
Gender and sport
Feminism and society
Ice hockey articles needing expert attention
Women in sports
Women's ice hockey
Discrimination articles needing expert attention
Gender equality
Ice hockey
Sexuality and gender-related prejudices
Gender studies articles needing expert attention